Lediharwa is a village in West Champaran district in the Indian state of Bihar.

Demographics
As of 2011 India census, Lediharwa had a population of 778 in 142 households. Males constitute 51.54% of the population and females 48.45%. Lediharwa has an average literacy rate of 38.81%, lower than the national average of 74%: male literacy is 65.23%, and female literacy is 34.76%. In Lediharwa, 23.65% of the population is under 6 years of age.

References

Villages in West Champaran district